Kuwait competed at the 1976 Summer Olympics in Montreal, Quebec, Canada. 15 competitors, all men, took part in 13 events in 4 sports.

Athletics

Men's 400m Hurdles
 Abdlatef Abbas Hashem
 Heats — 53.06s (→ did not advance)

Men's 4x100 metres Relay
Abdulaziz Abdulkareem, Abdulkareem Alawad, Ibraheem Alrabee, and Abdlatef Abbas Hashem
 Heat — 41.61s (→ did not advance)

Diving

Fencing

Four fencers represented Kuwait in 1976.

Men's foil
 Jamal Ameen
 Abdul Nasser Al-Sayegh
 Ahmed Al-Arbeed

Men's team foil
 Ahmed Al-Arbeed, Jamal Ameen, Ali Al-Khawajah, Abdul Nasser Al-Sayegh

Judo

References

External links
Official Olympic Reports

Nations at the 1976 Summer Olympics
1976
Summer Olympics